Big Sky Resort is a ski resort in the western United States, located in southwestern Montana in Madison County. An hour south of Bozeman via U.S. Highway 191 in Big Sky, Montana, it is the second-largest ski resort in the United States by acreage.

In July 2013, Big Sky Resort acquired  on Spirit Mountain, which were previously owned by Spanish Peaks, a private club. In October of the same year, Big Sky Resort acquired the terrain and facilities of Moonlight Basin, a neighboring resort that shared the northern exposure of Lone Mountain.

Big Sky Resort also offers meeting space for conferences, weddings, and corporate retreats.

Resort history

The resort was founded by Montana native Chet Huntley, the retired co-anchorman of The Huntley–Brinkley Report of NBC News.

The first three lifts installed included a gondola and two chairlifts.

Boyne Resorts purchased the resort in 1976, following Huntley's death from cancer in March 1974, and the decision of owner Chrysler Corporation to divest its real estate development assets.

The resort grew steadily over the following decades, adding lifts and more than tripling the terrain available for skiing and snowboarding. The fifth lift, a second chairlift on Andesite Mountain, was installed in the summer of 1979. The Mad Wolf lift was replaced with the Thunder Wolf high speed quad in 1994.

Two lifts were added in the 1980s, Gondola Two was installed in parallel to the first gondola, and the Challenger double chair served upper-elevation expert terrain on the north edge of the ski area. A tow was later added above this lift. Gondola Two was replaced with a Doppelmayr high speed quad, Swift Current 4, in 1997. The eighth lift at Big Sky was the Southern Comfort on the south side of Andesite Mountain, a Heron-Poma triple chairlift acquired from Copper Mountain in Colorado, installed in 1990 and upgraded to a high speed quad for the 2004-2005 ski season.

In the fall of 1995, Big Sky installed the Lone Peak Tram to provide access to expert terrain from the  Lone Mountain summit.  The Shedhorn double chair was also part of this expansion, installed in 1995 on the lower south face of Lone Mountain.

In 1990 the Shoshone Condominium Hotel and the Yellowstone Conference Center were built.

In April 2000, Boyne Resorts announced that an estimated $400 million in improvements would take place over the next ten years to the Mountain Village and the ski area. Later in 2000, the $54 million Summit Hotel was completed. In late 2007, the $25 million Village Center Complex was opened.

In 2007, Big Sky expanded the skiing opportunities on the south face of Lone Peak with the reinstallation of the original Southern Comfort triple chairlift as the Dakota chairlift on the south side of Lone Peak, providing access to the accompanying out-of-bounds sidecountry, Dakota Territory. Gondola One was retired in the summer of 2008, dismantled due to the rising cost of repairs.

Big Sky's neighbor on its north boundary, Moonlight Basin, merged with Big Sky Resort in October 2013.

In 2016, Big Sky Resort installed two new Doppelmayr chairlifts as part of BigSky2025, a 10-year, $150-million project. The Lone Peak triple chairlift in the bowl was replaced with Powder Seeker, a six-seat high-speed chairlift with heated seats and bubble covers. The same summer, the Challenger double chairlift, which had suffered a mechanical failure, was replaced by a triple chairlift with a conveyor load.

In 2018, as part of the Big Sky 2025 plan, Doppelmayr built North America's first ever high speed eight pack in the form of the Ramcharger 8, which replaced an existing Doppelmayr high speed quad from the base area to the summit of Andesite Mountain and has many of the same features as Powder Seeker. Billed as "the most technologically advanced lift ever built," it opened on December 15, 2018. The original high speed quad was reinstalled on Lone Peak, where it replaced the Shedhorn double chairlift.

Activities
Winter activities include skiing and snowboarding, seven terrain parks, zip-line, and snowshoeing. Summer attractions include zip-lines, archery, tennis, hiking, and mountain biking trails on the mountain.

Terrain Aspects - Skiing
 North: 37%
 West: 2%
 East: 36%
 South: 25%

Lone Peak Tram

It provides access to the most difficult terrain at Big Sky Resort, including former Moonlight Basin terrain. Construction was completed by the high-altitude construction firm Matrix, based in Alaska.
Starting in the summer 2012 season, Big Sky Resort introduced daily summer tram rides to take visitors to the top of Lone Peak, called The Lone Peak Expedition. Starting in the 2021/2022 season, access to the tram requires the purchase of a tram pass pack, individual day passes between $20-$80 USD, a Gold season pass for unlimited access, or a Double Black season pass for 10 days.
Early 2022, it was announced that the tram would receive major upgrades, placing its new lower base directly next to the top station of a new gondola and featuring a much greater capacity per ride.

References

External links

 BigSkyResort.com — official site

Buildings and structures in Madison County, Montana
Ski areas and resorts in Montana
Resorts in the United States
Hotels in Montana
Tourist attractions in Madison County, Montana
1973 establishments in Montana